Louis Lacoste (April 3, 1798 – November 26, 1878) was a Quebec notary and political figure. He was a Conservative member of the Senate of Canada from 1867 to 1878.

He was born in Boucherville in 1798. He studied law and became a notary, practicing in Boucherville. In 1834, he was elected to represent the county of Chambly in the Legislative Assembly of Lower Canada, serving until 1838. He supported Louis-Joseph Papineau and was arrested in December 1837; he was released in July 1838. He was elected to the Legislative Assembly of the Province of Canada for Chambly in an 1843 by-election; he was reelected in 1844. He did not run in 1848 but was elected again in an 1849 by-election and reelected in 1851. He was elected again in 1858 and resigned in 1861 to run for a seat in the Legislative Council for Montarville division in 1861. He served until Confederation, when he was named to the Senate.

He died in Boucherville in 1878 while still in office.

He was the father of Alexandre Lacoste, who also became a member of the Senate.

References
 
 
 

1798 births
1878 deaths
Canadian senators from Quebec
Members of the Legislative Assembly of the Province of Canada from Canada East
Members of the Legislative Council of the Province of Canada
Conservative Party of Canada (1867–1942) senators
People from Boucherville
Lacoste family